Flora of the Southern United States was the first comprehensive treatment of flora of the southeastern United States. It was written by Alvan Wentworth Chapman and published in 1860.

See also
Flora of the Southeastern United States
Flora (publication)

References

External links
Biodiversitylibrary.org: Flora of the Southern United States— summary on Biodiversity Heritage Library

 
Southern United States
Botany in North America
Flora of the Southeastern United States
1860 non-fiction books
1860 in the United States